Thomas Gerbach Laubscher (8 October 1963 – 26 May 2007) was a South African rugby union player who played at tighthead prop.

Playing career

Laubscher made his Springbok debut in 1994 against  at the Boet Erasmus Stadium in Port Elizabeth. He toured with the Springboks to Britain at the end of 1994 and to Europe and Britain in 1995. Laubscher played six test matches and six tour matches for the Springboks, and was known as an exceptionally strong scrummager.

Test history

Death
Laubscher died in a road accident when he and his son, stopped to help a driver who had hit a cow in foggy weather conditions, when he was hit by another vehicle.

See also
List of South Africa national rugby union players – Springbok no. 620

References

1963 births
2007 deaths
South African rugby union players
South Africa international rugby union players
Boland Cavaliers players
Western Province (rugby union) players
People from the West Coast District Municipality
Rugby union players from the Western Cape
Rugby union props